Angela Schijf is a Dutch actress. On 3 July 2002 she married the Belgian actor Tom Van Landuyt; together, they have 3 daughters. She is best known for playing Eva van Dongen in the Dutch TV-series Flikken Maastricht. She also performs the show Kreutzersonate als het verlangen maar stopt in theatres around the Netherlands and Belgium with her husband and 2 musicians.

Filmografie

Television

Movie

References

External links

1979 births
Living people
People from Uithoorn
21st-century Dutch actresses
Dutch film actresses
Dutch television actresses
Belgian television actresses